The Worcestershire Senior Cup (officially The Worcestershire Football Association Senior Invitation Cup) is a football competition organised by the Worcestershire County Football Association.  It began in the 1893-94 season, with Redditch Town taking the first honours. Due to the dearth of professional clubs within the county, few professional teams have taken part, though Walsall, Aston Villa, and Kidderminster Harriers are past winners.

The Senior Cup is the more senior of the county's two main cups, and at present entry is restricted to those clubs which are affiliated to the County FA and compete in the Southern Football League or higher.  Clubs from lower leagues compete in the Worcestershire Senior Urn.

Winners
The winners of the Cup have been as follows:
1893–94 - Redditch Town
1894–95 - Oldbury Town
1895–96 - Kidderminster Harriers 
1896–97 - Oldbury Town
1897–98 - Oldbury Town
1898–99 - Bourneville Athletic
1899–1900 - No competition, reason unknown
1900–01 - Berwick Rangers (Worcs)
1901–02 - Berwick Rangers (Worcs)
1902–03 - Bourneville Athletic
1903–04 - Kidderminster Harriers 
1904–05 - Stourbridge
1905–06 - Stourbridge
1906–07 - Brierley Hill Alliance
1907–08 - Worcester City
1908–09 - Worcester City
1909–10 - Worcester City
1910–11 - Worcester City
1911–12 - Worcester City
1912–13 - Worcester City
1913–14 - Worcester City
1915–1919 No competition due to World War I 
1919–20 - Stourbridge
1920–21 - Kidderminster Harriers 
1921–22 - Stourbridge
1922–23 - Cradley Heath
1923–24 - Stourbridge
1924–25 - Cradley Heath
1925–26 - Cradley Heath
1926–27 - Cradley Heath
1927–28 - Stourbridge
1928–29 - Worcester City
1929–30 - Worcester City
1930–31 - Redditch Town
1931–32 - Kidderminster Harriers 
1932–33 - Worcester City
1933–34 - Walsall
1934–35 - Kidderminster Harriers 
1935–36 - Kidderminster Harriers 
1936–37 - Kidderminster Harriers 
1937–38 - Brierley Hill Alliance
1938–39 - Aston Villa
1939–40 - Worcester City
1941–1945 No competition due to World War II
1945–46 - Worcester City
1946–47 - Bromsgrove Rovers
1947–48 - Bromsgrove Rovers
1948–49 - Worcester City
1949–50 - Stourbridge
1950–51 - Brierley Hill Alliance
1951–52 - Halesowen Town
1952–53 - Hereford United
1953–54 - Aston Villa
1954–55 - Hereford United
1955–56 - Worcester City
1956–57 - Worcester City
1957–58 - Worcester City
1958–59 - Worcester City
1959–60 - Bromsgrove Rovers
1960–61 - Worcester City
1961–62 - Halesowen Town
1962–63 - Worcester City
1963–64 - Hereford United
1964–65 - Worcester City
1965–66 - Kidderminster Harriers
1966–67 - Kidderminster Harriers
1967–68 - Stourbridge
1968–69 - Kidderminster Harriers
1969–70 - Worcester City
1970–71 - Kidderminster Harriers
1971–72 - Kidderminster Harriers
1972–73 - Alvechurch
1973–74 - Alvechurch
1974–75 - Redditch Town
1975–76 - Redditch Town
1976–77 - Alvechurch
1977–78 - Worcester City
1978–79 - Kidderminster Harriers
1979–80 - Worcester City
1980–81 - Stourbridge
1981–82 - Worcester City
1982–83 - Kidderminster Harriers
1983–84 - Worcester City
1984–85 - Kidderminster Harriers
1985–86 - Kidderminster Harriers
1986–87 - Bromsgrove Rovers
1987–88 - Worcester City
1988–89 - Kidderminster Harriers
1989–90 - Kidderminster Harriers
1990–91 - Kidderminster Harriers
1991–92 - Bromsgrove Rovers
1992–93 - Kidderminster Harriers
1993–94 - Bromsgrove Rovers
1994–95 - Bromsgrove Rovers
1995–96 - Bromsgrove Rovers
1996–97 - Worcester City
1997–98 - Kidderminster Harriers
1998–99 - Kidderminster Harriers
1999–2000 - Kidderminster Harriers
2000–01 - Moor Green
2001–02 - Kidderminster Harriers
2002–03 - Halesowen Town
2003–04 - Sutton Coldfield Town
2004–05 - Halesowen Town
2005–06 - Moor Green
2006–07 - Evesham United
2007–08 - Redditch United
2008–09 - Evesham United
2009–10 - Kidderminster Harriers
2010–11 - Stourbridge
2011–12 - Stourbridge
2012–13 - Stourbridge
2013–14 - Redditch United
2014–15 - Kidderminster Harriers
2015–16 - Worcester City
2016–17 - Kidderminster Harriers
2017–18 - Evesham United
2018–19 - Alvechurch
2019–20 - Abandoned due to COVID (Alvechurch and Bromsgrove Sporting won the semi-finals)
2020–21 - No competition due to COVID 
2021–22 - Pershore Town

Records
Record number of wins:
 Worcester City (28)
Most successive wins:
 Worcester City (7)

References

Worcestershire FA website

County Cup competitions
Recurring sporting events established in 1893
Football in Worcestershire